The Western Mustangs football team (also known as the Western Ontario Mustangs) represents the University of Western Ontario in Canadian university football. The Mustangs compete as a member of the Ontario University Athletics (OUA), under the U Sports association.

With their first full season in 1929, the Western Mustangs are one of the most decorated football teams in Canadian university history. The team has had the most Vanier Cup national championship appearances, having made it to the title game 15 times (most recently in 2021). The Mustangs have won eight Vanier Cups, second only to the Laval Rouge et Or. The Mustangs have also won the Yates Cup conference championship 34 times in team history; more than any other Canadian University. The Western Mustangs play their home games at Western Alumni Stadium, located on the south side of campus. With 8,000 seats, Western Alumni Stadium is the second-largest stadium in the OUA association.

There have been three former Western Mustang team members who have participated in the NFL Draft: John Priestner (Baltimore Colts, 1979), Tyrone Williams (Phoenix Cardinals, 1992) and Vaughn Martin (San Diego Chargers, 2009).

History

Early development 
One of the earliest known football games to have been played at Western was in 1908 by a group of medical students. Known as 'rugby' or 'rugby football', this team joined a local junior league and played a small series of games that year. In 1912, the Medical faculty students as well as the Arts faculty students joined and formed one team which played along with the local City of London team in the Junior Ontario Rugby Union.

Western joined the intermediate intercollegiate football team in 1920 and with a very rough start, the team persevered with the support of the university for the next couple of seasons. With improved coaching from 1923 to 1926, the team went on to win their first intermediate intercollegiate championship in 1927 with Art Wilson as the head coach.

J.W. Little Memorial Stadium 
In 1928, construction began on the first stadium on campus. With the help of Fielding Yost, the stadium was built to proper football guidelines. The J.W. Little Memorial Stadium opened the following year on October 19, 1929 and was named after Colonel J.W. Little, a former City of London mayor. Opening day, Western's new senior intermediate team played Queen's University and lost 25-2.

Improvements like an electronic scoreboard and a radio booth were added in 1948 and 1949, respectively. By 1960, the stadium expanded seating from the original 5,000 seats to well over 7,200 seats. This was then expanded to 8,000 in future years.

The stadium held its last game in 1999, and the new TD Stadium was built in 2000.

Senior Intermediate Team 
The entry into the senior intercollegiate league in 1929 brought Western into the spotlight. Joe Breen became the head coach for the Senior Intermediate Team this year, with assistant coach Mitt Burt and Paul Hauch as captain. 1929 was the first year Western played senior football.

The Mustangs continued to play in league throughout the early 1930s, but had a mixed bag of wins and losses, but did win their first Yates Cup championship in 1931. By 1935, Breen retired as the head coach and Western football got a jumpstart when Bill Storen and John Metras came on as head coach and assistant coach this same year.

Both coaches were very knowledgeable and skillful football players and with their guidance, the team gained more and more wins each year. By 1939, the team accomplished their first undefeated season, notably with Joe Krol as a member of this historic team.

Metras took over as head coach in 1940, but with the beginning of the Second World War, the Canadian Intercollegiate Athletic Union had suspended all athletic activities from 1940-1945. This decision was met with mixed reviews. It was at this time that Metras chose to play the Western senior team under the organization of Western's Canadian Officers' Training Corps (COTC). Known as the COTC Mustangs, they played in both Canada and American service and college teams.

After WWII into the 1950s 
Canadian intercollegiate athletics resumed in 1946, and the Mustangs saw another undefeated schedule season that year, winning their third Yates Cup. Some notable players this year were Bob McFarlane, Don McFarlane, George Curtis, and quarterback Herb Ballantyne.

By 1948, the team was attracting thousands of fans for every game and the CP Rail would run special trains to help accommodate getting the team, band, and fans to and from away games. Videotaping, electronic score boards, and radio broadcasting were all brought to the games starting in the 1948 season.

Into the 1950s, the Mustangs continued the excellent playing and Metras continued as the head coach. The local newspaper, the London Free Press, was diligently attending and recording all the games the Mustangs played. Western football became a part of the London community and not just the student body. In 1950, the Mustangs defeated the Toronto Varsity Blues at Varsity Stadium 8-1 with over 27,000 spectators, winning their 6th Yates Cup championship.

The next couple of seasons saw players like Don Getty, Murray Henderson, Bill Britton, John Girvin, Frank Cosentino, and Ed Meads all play for the Mustangs. The Western Mustangs went on to win five Yates Cups in the 1950s.

League expansion 

By the 1960s, the Senior Intercollegiate league changed its name to the Ontario-Quebec Athletic Association and the Canadian Intercollegiate Athletic Union started to include more Canadian universities. Prior to this, Western only played three other teams in their regular season; Queen's, Toronto, and McGill. With this change, Western also started to play McMaster, Waterloo, Wilfrid Laurier and Windsor in this new group.

1960s 
The Mustangs saw more difficult times in the 1960s. The first early seasons of the decade saw good highlights, such as an 85-yard touchdown by John Wydareny in 1960 and a 99-yard touchdown by Whit Tucker in 1961. The team lost their steam in 1963 with a 3-3 record. With some disappointing losses, the Mustangs did not win a single Yates Cup during this decade. Metras retired as the football coach in 1969, but stayed on as the Director of Athletics for Western.

Coaching history 
Former Head Coach Larry Haylor led the team from 1984 until his retirement in 2006, and held the Canadian Interuniversity Sport record for most wins as head coach.

The team is currently coached by Greg Marshall, who took over for Haylor in 2007 after his aforementioned retirement. Marshall won the Hec Crighton Trophy for most outstanding player in U Sports football as a player for the Mustangs in 1980 and has also coached professional football for the Hamilton Tiger-Cats from 2004-2006. In the 12 seasons that Marshall has served as the Mustangs head coach, the team has won the Yates Cup seven times, in 2007, 2008, 2010, 2013, 2017, 2018 and 2021 and two Vanier Cup in 2017 and 2021. The Mustangs have been one of the top teams in U Sports football as of late, posting a 90-12 regular season record between 2008 and 2021.

List of head coaches

Season-by-season records 
The following is the record of the University of Western Ontario Mustangs football team since 2002:

National award winners
Hec Crighton Trophy: Jamie Bone (1978), Greg Marshall (1980), Blake Marshall (1986), Tim Tindale (1991, 1993), Andy Fantuz (2005), Chris Merchant (2019)
J. P. Metras Trophy: Pierre Vercheval (1987), Deionte Knight (2021)
Presidents' Trophy: Brent Lewis (1987), Derek Krete (1996), Pawel Kruba (2013), Fraser Sopik (2018)
Peter Gorman Trophy: Sean Reade (1992), Andrew Fantuz (2002), Tyler Varga (2011)
Russ Jackson Award: Nick Vanin (2017), Mackenzie Ferguson (2018)
Frank Tindall Trophy: Frank Cosentino (1970), Darwin Semotiuk (1976), Larry Haylor (1990, 1998), Greg Marshall (2018, 2019)
Lois and Doug Mitchell Award: Tim Tindale (1993)

Western Mustangs in the CFL

As of the end of the 2022 CFL season, 12 former Mustangs players were on CFL teams' rosters:
Jordan Beaulieu, Saskatchewan Roughriders
David Brown, Montreal Alouettes
Dylan Giffen, Toronto Argonauts
Sean Jamieson, Montreal Alouettes
Hakeem Johnson, BC Lions
Shaq Johnson, Ottawa Redblacks
Deionte Knight, Toronto Argonauts
Marc Liegghio, Winnipeg Blue Bombers
Zach Lindley, Montreal Alouettes
David Mackie, BC Lions
Myles Manalo, Hamilton Tiger-Cats
Fraser Sopik, Calgary Stampeders

References

External links 
 Official website

 
U Sports football teams
Sports teams in London, Ontario
Sports clubs established in 1929
1929 establishments in Ontario